The Chapel of Sacred Mirrors (CoSM) is a transdenominational church and 501(c)(3) organization dedicated to the realization of a shared 1985 vision of the American artists Alex and Allyson Grey to build a contemporary public chapel as "a sanctuary for spiritual renewal through contemplation of transformative art" 

Conceived to house Alex Grey's Sacred Mirrors (a series of twenty-one art-works that examine the body, spirit, and mind in rich detail) along with other important works of visionary and contemporary spiritual art, the organization's mission is "building an enduring sanctuary of visionary art to inspire every pilgrim's creative path and embody the values of love and evolutionary wisdom".

Foundation, 1996–2003 

The Foundation for the Chapel of Sacred Mirrors Ltd. was formed in 1996 as a nonprofit charity to raise awareness and funds for the creation of the Chapel; advisory board members have included Deepak Chopra, Ken Wilber, Mathew Fox, and Marcia Tucker. In 2003, upon the suggestion of shaman Alex Stark, Alex and Allyson Grey began holding full moon prayer ceremonies in their Brooklyn home to facilitate the construction of the chapel. Due to noise complaints by neighbors, the Greys' home became unsuitable.

Chapel of Sacred Mirrors, New York City: 2004–2009 

Thanks to an outpouring of support from the nascent community that was forming around these gatherings, the first Chapel of Sacred Mirrors opened in a donated space in Chelsea in the heart of NYC's gallery and nightclub district on the autumnal equinox of 2004.

Along with the Sacred Mirrors series, the original chapel also displayed a number of Alex Grey's major works (many of which had been repurchased from collectors for the foundation) including Theologue, Net of Being, Cosmic Christ, and Journey of the Wounded Healer, as well as Allyson Grey's Secret Language paintings, and occasional exhibitions of fellow visionary artists. With monthly interfaith celebrations that were held on the New and Full moons, and workshops by leaders in the fields or art, science, and religion, the Chapel of Sacred Mirrors quickly became established as a "mecca" of the New York "New Age" community. The use of Alex Grey's artwork on the album covers and stage show of the popular rock group Tool, album artwork for The Beastie Boys and Nirvana, and as part of a major installation at the Burning Man festival in 2006, greatly increased Alex Grey's popularity among the youth and New Age counterculture, The original NYC Chapel of Sacred Mirrors also featured workshops on painting, sacred geometry, and sacred architecture, as well as a series of popular "Entheogenic Salons" that included live painting by Alex and Allyson Grey, along with international electronic music DJs and producers, video artists, dance, and other performances.

The Sacred Mirrors and visionary art 

The Sacred Mirrors series, which were created over a ten-year period between 1979 and 1988, were originally inspired by a lysergic acid diethylamide (LSD) vision that Alex and Allyson Grey shared in 1976, during which they both experienced the interconnectedness of all beings and things in the form of a "toroidal fountain and drain of self-illuminating love energy, a cellular node or jewel in a network that linked omnidirectionally without end" that Alex later named "the Universal Mind Lattice". (Allyson Grey's painting Jewel Net of Indra was similarly inspired by this shared visionary experience) This series of paintings has been exhibited internationally, and are the subject of the 1990 book Sacred Mirrors: The Visionary Art of Alex Grey, which has been translated into nine languages and sold over 150,000 copies worldwide.
The subtitle of this book is now believed to be one of the key influences in the naming of a new genre now known as "visionary art". While Alex Grey himself defines visionary art as "the creative expression of glimpses into the sacred unconsciousness"  and states that its ultimate purpose is "the mystical experience of spiritual illumination, unity, wisdom, and love". Claiming a lineage that includes the ancient shamanic cave-painters, the 12th century Abbess Hildegard of Bingen, Hieronymus Bosch, and the English mystical painter and writer, William Blake, contemporary visionary art is also characterized by the belief  that along with traditional methodologies such as fasting, meditation, yogic exercises, breath work, and prayer, "vision drugs" such as LSD, psilocybin, mescaline, and dimethyltryptamine (DMT), can also be utilized as tools by artists seeking mystical visions.

Works by painters such as Pablo Amaringo, Alex Grey, Ernst Fuchs, and Robert Venosa, who all openly admit the direct influence of consciousness-altering compounds upon their art, have previously been loosely categorized under the more profane category of "psychedelic art". By consciously advocating these compounds as "entheogens" (generating-God-within), or plants and drugs that invoke a sense of the numinous or a mystical experience, as opposed to mere "psychedelics", visionary art claims a sacred and profound nature for these compounds. The fact that Alex Grey credits the inspiration of the Sacred Mirrors to an LSD experience he mystically shared with his later-wife Allyson makes this series arguably one of the most famous examples of contemporary visionary art. (Ayahuasca Dreaming, by the American painter Robert Venosa (1936–2011), is another example.) The inspiration by the Greys to build a Chapel in 1985 is also credited to a shared drug experience, this time on the powerful "empathogen" MDMA.

Dedicated to fostering interfaith and post-denominational spiritual understanding, the Greys envision the Chapel of Sacred Mirrors as "a new type of sacred space with both a personal and a planetary perspective … a Chapel of transformative art that aligns the individual self: body, mind, and spirit, through contemplation of the Sacred Mirrors  … "by peeling away our accumulated layers of separateness, showing we are all made of the same miraculous blood, guts, and cosmic dust."

Chapel of Sacred Mirrors, Wappinger, New York; 2009–present 

While the original Chapel of Sacred Mirrors in New York City was never intended to be a permanent site, its popularity amongst the New York 'New Age' community allowed it to survive longer than initially conceived, operating from the autumnal equinox of 2004 until January 1, 2009.

On September 12, 2008, after a lengthy search for a permanent site, the Foundation for the Chapel of Sacred Mirrors purchased a forty-acre former interfaith center on the Hudson River 65 miles north of New York City in the Wheeler Hill Historic District in Wappinger, N.Y. . In November 2008, the organization was recognized as providing an extraordinary environment for contemplation, and as a center for encouraging the creative spirit, and was granted church status with a permanent 501(c)(3).

Alex and Allyson Grey live permanently on the grounds, which also house a 10,000-square-foot guesthouse with cafe and gift-shop. The Greys' popular full moon ceremonies have continued uninterrupted at this new location, along with special events, permaculture courses, and a variety of workshops that have attracted a number of guest presenters including the American folk-musician and eco-activist Pete Seeger, and eco-artist Julia Butterfly Hill With the Greys' desire to make the Chapel of Sacred Mirrors open and representative to all visionary and contemporary sacred art, visiting artists are encouraged to create murals, labyrinths, gardens, and sculptures; most notably Kate Raudenbush's Altered State, a two-story domed steel structure first seen at Burning Man in 2008 that now resides in a meadow on the CoSM grounds.

The closing of the New York City location on January 1, 2009 signaled the start of a fundraising phase by Alex and Allyson Grey as their live painting performances have become increasingly popular and included in festivals and special events worldwide. Along with CoSM's own fund-raising events, the Greys are popular speakers who have been invited to present on their art and the building of CoSM at a wide variety of events ranging from local health and wellness festivals to international symposiums on psychedelic research (World Psychedelic Forum, MAPS' psychedelic science events) and the transpersonal experience (ITA). In 2013 Alex Grey was invited to present at TedX in Hawaii. Observers half the couple's age have remarked upon their drive and energy for a project that will take many years to complete.

The Chapel of Sacred Mirrors' permanent collection of Alex and Allyson Grey's art has currently been placed in storage as fundraising continues. The 2013 Kickstarter funding campaign for the building of the first exhibition area—to be called Entheon—is the 5th most funded ART project in Kickstarter history, raising close to double its $125,000 goal. Entheon is scheduled to open in Fall of 2017, with the construction of the actual Chapel of Sacred Mirrors projected for 2020.

References

External links
Official web page

Churches in Manhattan
Art museums and galleries in New York (state)
Wappinger, New York
Churches in Dutchess County, New York